The Naqshbandi is a major Sunni order of Sufism. Its name is derived from Baha-ud-Din Naqshband Bukhari. Naqshbandi masters trace their lineage to the Islamic prophet Muhammad through Abu Bakr, the first Caliph of Sunni Islam and Ali, the fourth Caliph of Sunni Islam. It is because of this dual lineage through Ali and Abu Bakr through the 6th Imam Jafar al Sadiq that the order is also known as the "convergence of the two oceans" or "Sufi Order of Jafar al Sadiq".

History 

The Naqshbandi order owes many insights to Yusuf Hamdani and Abdul Khaliq Gajadwani in the 12th century, the latter of whom is regarded as the organizer of the practices and is responsible for placing stress upon the purely silent invocation. It was later associated with Baha-ud-Din Naqshband Bukhari in the 14th century, hence the name of the order. The name can be interpreted as "engraver (of the heart)", "pattern maker", "reformer of patterns", "image maker", or "related to the image maker". The way is sometimes referred to as "the sublime sufi path" and "the way of the golden chain."

Afterwards, a branch or sub-order name was added. From 'Ubeydullah Ahrar to Imam Rabbani, the way was called "Naqshbandiyya-Ahrariyya"; from Imam Rabbani to Shamsuddin Mazhar "Naqshbandiyya-Mujaddadiyya"; from Shamsuddin Mazhar to Khalid al-Baghdadi "Naqshbandiyya-Mazhariyya"; from Mawlana Khalid onwards "Naqshbandiyya-Khalidiyya"; "Naqshbandiyya-Mustafvi" (Khalidi) and so on.

South Asia

The Naqshbandiyya order became an influential factor in Indo-Muslim life and for two centuries it was the principal spiritual order in the Indian subcontinent. Baqi Billah Berang, who was born in Kabul and brought up and educated in Kabul and Samarqand, is credited for bringing the order to India during the end of the 16th century. He tried to spread his knowledge about the order but died three years later. His disciple Ahmad Sirhindi took over after his death, and it was through him that the order gained popularity within a short period of time. Shah Waliullah Dehlawi was an 18th-century member of the order. Shah Waliullah Dehlawi was an 18th-century member of the order.

Syria
The Naqshbandiyya order was introduced into Syria at the end of the 17th century by Murad Ali al-Bukhari, who established himself in Damascus and traveled throughout Arabia. His branch became known as the Muradiyya and was led by his descendants. In 1820, Khalid Shahrazuri rose as a prominent Naqshbandi leader in the Ottoman world and his order became known as the Khalidiyya which spread for at least two decades. In Syria and Lebanon, the leaders of every active Naqshbandiyya group acknowledged its spiritual lineage. Later, a strife between Khalid's khalifas led to disruption of the order and it divide. The Farmadiyya branch, which practices silent and vocal invocation, is still present in Lebanon and is named after Ali-Farmadi. The pre-Mujaddidi line of the Naqshbandiyya in Greater Syria came to an end when political leader Musa Bukhar died in 1973. The only branch to have survived till recently is the one based in the khanqah al-Uzbakiyya in Jerusalem.

Egypt
The Naqshbandi order rose to prominence in Egypt during the 19th century. A major khanqah was constructed in 1851 by Abbas I as a favor to the Naqshbandi sheikh Ahmad Ashiq, who led the order until his death in 1883. Ahmad Ashiq practiced the Diya'iyya branch of the Khalidiyya. Two other versions of Naqshbandiyya spread in Egypt in the last decades of the 19th century: the Judiyya, led by sheikh Juda Ibrahim, and the Khalidiyya, led by Sudanese al-Sharif Isma'il al-Sinnari and his successors. These branches continued to grow and are still active today. Unfortunately, none of the early orders survived far into the 20th century, and all khanqahs in Egypt were closed in 1954 when the buildings were either assigned a different function or demolished.

China

Ma Laichi brought the Naqshbandi  order to China, creating the Khufiyya  Hua Si Sufi ; ("Multicolored Mosque") menhuan. Ma Mingxin, also brought the Naqshbandi order, creating the Jahriyya  menhuan. These two menhuan were rivals, and fought against each other which led to the Jahriyya Rebellion, Dungan revolt, and Dungan Revolt (1895).

Some Chinese Muslim Generals of the Ma Clique belonged to Naqshbandi Sufi menhuan including Ma Zhan'ao and Ma Anliang of the Khufiyya Naqshbandi menhuan. Ma Shaowu, and Ma Yuanzhang were other prominent leaders from the Jahriyya Naqshbandi menhuan.

Prominent sheikhs
Abdul Khaliq Ghijduwani (d. 1179), prominent sheikh whose teachings became known as the way of the Khojas (teachers) or Khwajagan (masters).
Baha-ud-Din Naqshband Bukhari (1318–1389), the founder of the Sufi Naqshbandi Order.
Khwaja Ahrar (1404-1490 AD), established the order in general.
Ahmad al-Farūqī al-Sirhindī (1564–1624), commonly known as Imam Rabbani, a mujaddid and leading Naqshbandi Sheikh from India.
Mawlana Khalid (1779–1827), the sheikh whom all the different branches of the Order in the Middle East and Caucasus spread from.
Uthman Sirâj-ud-Dîn Naqshbandi (1781-1867), was an 18th-century influential sufi, saint and Islamic scholar. 
Sheikh Ali Hisam-ad-Din Naqshbandi (1861 - 1939) was a 19th-century sufi, awliya' and  Islamic scholar born in Tawella.

Principal teachings

The Naqshbandi order has eleven principle teachings known as the Eleven Naqshbandi principles. The first eight were formulated by Abdul Khaliq Gajadwani, and the last three were added by Baha-ud-Din Naqshband Bukhari.
 Remembrance ( – ): Always orally and mentally repeating the dhikr.
 Restraint ( – ): Engaging in the heart repetition of the al-kalimat at-tayyiba phrase – "La-ilaha il-allah muhammadur rasul-allah".
 Watchfulness ( – ): Being conscientious over wandering thoughts while repeating Al-kalimat at-tayyiba.
 Recollection ( – ): Concentration upon the Divine presence in a condition of dhawq, foretaste, intuitive anticipation or perceptiveness, not using external aids.
 Awareness while breathing ( – ): Controlling one's breathing by not exhaling or inhaling in the forgetfulness of the Divine.
 Journeying in one's homeland ( - ): An internal journey that moves the person from having blameworthy to praiseworthy properties. This is also referred to as the vision or revelation of the hidden side of the shahada.
 Watching one's step ( - ): Do not be distracted from purpose of the ultimate journey.
 Solitude in a crowd ( - ): Although journey is outwardly in this world, it is inwardly with God.
 Temporal pause ( - ): Keeping account of how one spends his or her time. If time is spent rightfully give thanks and time is spent incorrectly ask for forgiveness.
 Numerical pause ( - ): Checking that the dhikr has been repeated in odd numbers.
 Heart pause ( - ): Forming a mental picture of one's heart with the name of God engraved to emphasize that the heart has no consciousness or goal other than God.

See also

References

Notes

Citations

Further reading
 
 
 Clayer, Nathalie, Muslim Brotherhood Networks, European History Online, Mainz: Institute of European History, 2011, retrieved: 23 May 2011.
 
 
Sufism in Central Asia A Force for Moderation or a Cause of Politicization? By Martha Brill Olcott.

External links
 

Sunni Sufi orders